The Caretaker  (also known as  The Guest) is a 1963 British drama film directed by Clive Donner and based on the Harold Pinter play of the same name. It was entered into the 13th Berlin International Film Festival where it won the Silver Bear Extraordinary Jury Prize.

Plot
While renovating his home in London, Aston, out of pity, allows an old homeless man to live with him while Aston's brother Mick torments the old man.

Cast
 Alan Bates as Mick
 Donald Pleasence as Mac Davies / Bernard Jenkins
 Robert Shaw as Aston

Production
The film was made by a partnership of six people, none of whom took payment: Clive Donner, Donald Pleasence, Alan Bates, Robert Shaw, Harold Pinter and Michael Birkett.

No distributor expressed interest in funding the film, which meant it was unable to attract investment from the National Film Finance Corporation, because it was unable to give money to projects without a reasonable chance of a commercial screening. The budget was eventually raised with the support of a consortium, credited in the film as being Peter Bridge, Peter Cadbury, Charles Kasher, Elizabeth Taylor, Richard Burton, Harry Saltzman, Peter Hall, Leslie Caron, Noël Coward and Peter Sellers, each member giving £1,000.

Composer Ron Grainer was tasked to produce not a score but a sequence of sound effects, often metallic in nature, but which also include the sound of a drip which occasionally falls from the attic ceiling and a squeak as Aston uses a screwdriver. Grainer used his previous experiences working with the BBC Radiophonic Workshop in the creation of the sound picture.

Reception
The film was unable to obtain a release in London until it first screened in New York. According to Janet Moat, "the film is striking. Donner deploys a non-musical soundtrack, close-ups and two-shots to unsettling and menacing effect."

References

External links

The Caretaker at BFI Screenonline
The Caretaker at Haroldpinter.org

1963 films
1963 drama films
British black-and-white films
British drama films
1960s English-language films
Films about homelessness
Films directed by Clive Donner
Films with screenplays by Harold Pinter
Films set in London
Films scored by Ron Grainer
1960s British films